Francesca Rhianna Semoso is a politician and former broadcaster from the Autonomous Region of Bougainville. She has held the positions of Speaker and Deputy Speaker of the Bougainville House of Representatives; prior to her political career she was a radio broadcaster at the National Broadcasting Commission of Papua New Guinea.

Life
Semoso was a broadcaster at the National Broadcasting Commission for ten years and later joined private radio station UMI FM for a period of four years. In 2003 she moved back to Bougainville to participate in the post-civil war peace process. She joined the Bougainville Constitutional Commission, and campaigned for the inclusion of Temporary Special Measures in the Constitution to provide reserved seats for women in the new parliament.

Semoso was elected as a member of parliament in 2005 in the North Bougainville Women's Constituency seat. She also served as the Deputy Chairperson on the Standing Order Committee and on the Parliament Business Committee. She stood for and won the same seat again in the 2015 election.

Semoso also works with the Bougainville Women’s Federation to address violence against women and other issues affecting women.

References

Living people
Year of birth missing (living people)
Speakers of the Bougainville House of Representatives
Members of the Bougainville House of Representatives
Bougainvillean women in politics
Papua New Guinean women in politics
Papua New Guinean broadcasters
People from the Autonomous Region of Bougainville